The ECW World Television Championship was a professional wrestling television championship contested for in Extreme Championship Wrestling (ECW). It was the secondary title of ECW.

Originally, ECW was a member of the National Wrestling Alliance (NWA), an organization with many member promotions. ECW withdrew as an NWA member in 1994. The championship remained active until April 2001, when ECW filed for bankruptcy. All of ECW's assets were later purchased by World Wrestling Entertainment (WWE) in mid-2003, including the copyrights to ECW's championships. In May 2006, WWE extended its promotion by adding ECW as a third additional brand, the others being Raw and SmackDown, in a brand extension. The ECW World Heavyweight Championship was the only former ECW title to be recommissioned by WWE for the new brand. While this championship remains decommissioned, its records are under the name "ECW Television Championship" on the official WWE website.

Title reigns were determined by professional wrestling matches, often contested under hardcore wrestling regulations, with wrestlers involved in pre-existing scripted feuds, plots and storylines or were awarded the title due to scripted circumstances. Wrestlers were portrayed as either villains or heroes as they followed a series of tension-building events, which culminated in a match or series of matches for the championship.

As implied by its name, the championship could only be won on television or on pay-per-view events. The title was won in one Canadian municipality and in five American states. The inaugural champion was Johnny Hotbody, who defeated Larry Winters at a live event to win the title in August 1992. Rhino, who won the title in September 2000, was the final wrestler to hold the title before ECW filed for bankruptcy. 2 Cold Scorpio had the most reigns as champion, with four. At 700 days, Rob Van Dam's reign from 1998 to 2000 was the longest in the title's history. The Tazmaniac and 2 Cold Scorpio's reigns in 1994 were the shortest title reigns at less than one day. Overall, there were 31 title reigns.

Reigns

Names

Reigns

Combined reigns

Notes

References

External links
ECW World Television Championship on WWE.com
ECW Television Championship reigns by Wrestling Title Histories
ECW World Television Championship

ECW World Television Champions
ECW Television Champions
Television wrestling championships
ECW World Television Championship